Jorge Almansa (born 17 April 1991) is a Spanish volleyball player for CSA Steaua București and the Spanish national team.

He participated at the 2017 Men's European Volleyball Championship.

References

1991 births
Living people
Spanish men's volleyball players
Spanish expatriate sportspeople in Romania
Expatriate volleyball players in Romania
Jugador del equipo de superliga masculina unicaja almeria